"I'm Still Crazy" is a song co-written and recorded by American country music artist Vern Gosdin.  It was released in May 1989 as the first single from the album Alone.  The song was Gosdin's third and final number one on the country chart.  The single went to number one for one week and spent a total of fourteen weeks on the country chart.  Gosdin wrote the song with his son Steve and Buddy Cannon.

Chart performance

Year-end charts

References

1989 singles
Vern Gosdin songs
Songs written by Buddy Cannon
Songs written by Vern Gosdin
Song recordings produced by Bob Montgomery (songwriter)
Columbia Records singles
1989 songs